The 1994–95 Memphis Tigers men's basketball team represented Memphis State University as a member of the Great Midwest Conference during the 1994–95 NCAA Division I men's basketball season. The Tigers were led by head coach Larry Finch and played their home games at the Pyramid Arena in Memphis, Tennessee.

The Tigers won the regular season conference title and received an at-large bid to the 1995 NCAA tournament as No. 6 seed in the Midwest region. After defeating No. 11 seed Louisville and No. 3 seed Purdue, Memphis State fell to No. 2 seed Arkansas in the Midwest Regional semifinal. The team finished with a 24–10 record (9–3 Great Midwest).

Roster

Schedule and results

|-
!colspan=9 style= | Regular season

|-
!colspan=9 style= | Great Midwest Conference Tournament

|-
!colspan=9 style= | NCAA Tournament

Rankings

References

Memphis Tigers men's basketball seasons
Memphis State
Memphis State
1994 in sports in Tennessee
1995 in sports in Tennessee